The Episcopal Diocese of Taiwan is the Anglican diocese in Taiwan and a member diocese of the Episcopal Church of the United States. It was established in 1954, five years after Chinese Episcopalians fled from mainland China to Taiwan following the Chinese Communist Revolution in 1949.

Early leadership included American military chaplains connected to The Church of the Good Shepherd or St. John's, but in 1965 the Diocese elected its first Chinese bishop. In late 2019 Lennon Yuan-Jung Chang was elected the sixth Bishop of Taiwan, and was consecrated on February 22, 2020.

It is a diocese of Province 8 of the Episcopal Church in the United States of America.

History
From the earliest origins of Anglicanism on Taiwan (in or before 1895) until 1945, the island was part of the Nippon Sei Ko Kai Diocese of Osaka. As the presence of American Episcopalians on the island grew, the island came under the jurisdiction of the Episcopal Diocese of Honolulu until 1954, when it achieved some independence — the 60th anniversary of this date was celebrated in 2014. In 1961, Taiwan was organised into a missionary diocese of the Episcopal Church (USA); and in 1988 it was accepted as a full diocese of the church.

Parishes

Parishes of the diocese:

Bishops
From 1954 until 1960, Harry S. Kennedy, Bishop of Hololulu, had direct care of Taiwan; from 1961 until 1964, Charles P. Gilson, Suffragan Bishop of Honolulu, was delegated care of the missionary diocese and was resident on the island.

Further bishops of the missionary diocese were:
 James C. L. Wong (1965–1970; ; formerly Bishop of Jesselton)
 James Pong (1971–1979)
 Pui-Yeung Cheung (1980–1987)

Since full diocesan status was granted, the bishops diocesan have been:
 John C. T. Chien (1988–2001)
 David Jung-Hsin Lai (2001–2020)
 Lennon Yuan-Rung Chang (2020–present)

Charles P. Gilson
Charles Packard Gilson (September 3, 1899, Portland, MaineAugust 11, 1980, New London, New Hampshire), was consecrated a bishop at St Paul's Cathedral, Detroit during the Episcopal Church's 1961 General Convention. He had been missionary-in-charge at Taipei since 1958 when Convention elected him Suffragan Bishop of Honolulu in order to be the bishop resident on Taiwan. In 1964, his geographical jurisdiction (but not his post as Suffragan) was shifted to Okinawa.

Lennon Yuan-Rung Chang

Lennon Yuan-Rung Chang (given name Yuan-Rung/Yuanrong, English name Lennon) was consecrated a bishop on February 22, 2020 at St John's Cathedral, Taipei. Deaconed in 1995 and priested in 1999, he served as Chaplain of St. John's University (Taiwan) (1997–2016) and then as Vicar/Rector of Advent Church (on the same campus); he was also an associate professor of Mathematics at the university (1983–2016). Chang was elected bishop diocesan on August 3, 2019 and was duly consecrated and installed in 2020 by Michael Curry, Presiding Bishop (assisted by co-consecrators: Lai Jung-Hsin, then-Bishop of Taiwan; Bob Fitzpatrick, Bishop of Hawaii; Nathaniel Makoto Uematsu, Primate of Nippon Sei Ko Kai; Haruhisa Iso, Bishop of Osaka; and Greg Rickel, Bishop of Olympia). He served briefly as coadjutor bishop and succeeded as bishop diocesan automatically upon Lai's retirement in March 2020.

See also
 Anglican Communion

References

External links
 
 Morning Prayer and Holy Communion in Chinese (1928) liturgical material digitized by Charles Wohlers and Richard Mammana

Taiwan
Protestantism in Taiwan
Christian organizations established in 1954
Dioceses in Taiwan
Province 8 of the Episcopal Church (United States)